Lower Thames and Medway Passenger Boat Company is a river boat company which provides cruises on the River Thames in Gravesend and London, UK. Bateaux London cruises operate on the Thames under licence from London River Services, part of Transport for London.

Services
The company provides cruises on the River Thames. Princess Pocahontas cruises begin at Gravesend and head west past Tilbury Docks, under the Queen Elizabeth II Bridge at Dartford and through the Thames Barrier, calling at Greenwich Pier. Passengers may remain on board for an optional "stay-aboard" cruise along the Thames, which returns to Greenwich.

Vessels
The company owns a -long, double-decker leisure boat, MV Princess Pocahontas with seating for 134 passengers. It is named after the Native American Princess Pocahontas who is buried at Gravesend, and it is operated by Freemen of the River Thames.  They also own the passenger boat Duchess M which used to operate the ferry service between Gravesend and Tilbury.

London River Services
Transport operators in London
Transport in Thurrock